The Old Indian River County Courthouse is a historic courthouse in Vero Beach, Florida. Located at 2145 14th Avenue, the Old Indian River County Courthouse was constructed from April 1936 to March 1937 in the Masonry Vernacular, Art Moderne style by architect W.H. Garns. The structure was built by James T. Vocelle after he sought federal funding during 1933 and 1934 from the Public Works Administration to build the newly formed county a courthouse. The structure later became the Courthouse Executive Center after the county courthouse moved its seat to a new building at 2000 16th Avenue. On July 19, 1999, the Old Indian River County Courthouse was added to the U.S. National Register of Historic Places.

References

External links

 Indian River County listings at National Register of Historic Places
 Florida's Office of Cultural and Historical Programs
 Indian River County listings
 Indian River County Courthouse
 Indian River County Courthouse at Florida's Historic Courthouses
 Florida's Historic Courthouses by Hampton Dunn

Indian River County, Old
National Register of Historic Places in Indian River County, Florida
Buildings and structures in Vero Beach, Florida